Myrmicaria is an ant genus within the subfamily Myrmicinae.

Description
Myrmicaria can be discerned from related ant genera by a postpetiole with a complete tergosternal fusion, a postpetiole-gaster articulation shifted ventrally on the gaster, and an antenna with seven segments.

Biochemistry
Myrmicarin 430A, a heptacyclic alkaloid, was isolated from the poison glands of African Myrmicaria. The structure of its carbon skeleton was previously unknown.

Species

 Myrmicaria anomala Arnold, 1960
 Myrmicaria arachnoides (Smith, 1857)
 Myrmicaria arnoldi Santschi, 1925
 Myrmicaria basutorum Arnold, 1960
 Myrmicaria baumi Forel, 1901
 Myrmicaria birmana Forel, 1902
 Myrmicaria brunnea Saunders, 1842
 Myrmicaria carinata (Smith, 1857)
 Myrmicaria castanea Crawley, 1924
 Myrmicaria distincta Santschi, 1925
 Myrmicaria exigua Andre, 1890
 Myrmicaria faurei Arnold, 1947
 Myrmicaria fodica (Jerdon, 1851)
 Myrmicaria foreli Santschi, 1925
 Myrmicaria fumata Santschi, 1916
 Myrmicaria fusca Stitz, 1911
 Myrmicaria irregularis Santschi, 1925
 Myrmicaria laevior Forel, 1910
 Myrmicaria lutea Emery, 1900
 Myrmicaria melanogaster Emery, 1900
 Myrmicaria natalensis (Smith, 1858)
 Myrmicaria nigra (Mayr, 1862)
 Myrmicaria opaciventris Emery, 1893
 Myrmicaria reichenspergeri Santschi, 1925
 Myrmicaria rhodesiae Arnold, 1958
 Myrmicaria rugosa (Smith, 1860)
 Myrmicaria rustica Santschi, 1925
 Myrmicaria salambo Wheeler, 1922
 Myrmicaria striata Stitz, 1911
 Myrmicaria striatula Santschi, 1925
 Myrmicaria tigreensis (Guerin-Meneville, 1849)
 Myrmicaria vidua Smith, 1858

References

External links

Myrmicinae
Ant genera
Taxa named by William Wilson Saunders